Balmangan Tower is a ruined 16th-century tower house situated near Borgue, Dumfries and Galloway.

References
 Coventry, Martin (2001) The Castles of Scotland, 3rd Ed. Scotland: Goblinshead  
Maxwell-Irving, A. M. T. (2000) The Border Towers of Scotland, Creedon Publications 

Castles in Dumfries and Galloway
Category B listed buildings in Dumfries and Galloway
Listed castles in Scotland
Tower houses in Scotland